Ferial Alibali (née Meçule; 10 January 1933 – 14 May 2011) was an Albanian stage actress who performed more than 100 roles during her acting career. She was one of the founders of the Aleksandër Moisiu Theatre in Durrës. Two years later, she went to the Albanian National Theatre.

Biography
Ferial Alibali was born in Lushnjë, Albania on 10 January 1933. She first started her acting career in 1952 at the Professional Theater of Korçë. In 1955 she played her first roles in the Aleksandër Moisiu Theatre of Durrës. The play was the opening play of the theater. In 1975, her husband was arrested by the communist regime and she was barred from participating in the artistic life. She has been honoured by President Bamir Topi and several other public institutions with medals regarding her career. She died at the age of 78 on 14 May 2011 in Tirana.

Acting career 
Only few roles have been presented.

References

1933 births
2011 deaths
Albanian actresses
Albanian stage actresses
People from Lushnjë
20th-century Albanian actresses